Hotel St. George is a building in Brooklyn Heights, Brooklyn, New York City, which was once the city's largest hotel. The hotel is within the Brooklyn Heights Historic District.

The hotel was originally created by Union Navy Captain William Tumbridge in 1885, and various constituent buildings were built through 1929. The building survived a large 1995 fire. The building is now being used as student housing for surrounding colleges, especially New York University, Pace University, St. Francis College, and the New York Law School. The building is open only to its student residents, and has several lounge areas and one communal kitchen to be shared with the resident occupants. Attached to the building on the Clark Street side is a four floor "Eastern Athletic" gym that is separately owned.

It is located atop the New York City Subway's Clark Street station on the IRT Broadway–Seventh Avenue Line, one stop from Manhattan. The station's sole subway entrance continues to function inside the hotel itself, right before the main door leading to the former ballroom and guest check-in.

History

The hotel was originally created by Union Navy Captain William Tumbridge in 1885. After making a name for himself with his stockbroker company Tumbridge and Co, the captain sought to create a grand hotel. The designer and architect of the building was Emery Roth.

In the pre-World War II era, the St. George was a popular venue for society gatherings, weddings and celebrations, and a stomping ground for such celebrities as F. Scott Fitzgerald, Johnny Weissmuller, the Olympic swimmer and star of Tarzan movies, and others who ventured over the East River to dine at the hotel’s restaurants, to dance and socialize in its ballroom, and to take in the unrivaled view of Manhattan from its upper floors and roof terrace. The hotel boasted an enormous ballroom and a 120-foot natural salt water swimming pool. In its heyday, the hotel had 2,632 guest rooms, one thousand full-time employees, could accommodate nearly three thousand people for a dance, and could provide food for seven thousand guests at any one time. During WWII and the Korean War, the hotel was used to lodge troops and their families en route to or returning from their military assignments. Consequently, it was a place many families last saw their loved ones. The need for this type of lodging declined significantly following the loss of army and navy stations in Brooklyn during the late 1940s and 1950s. In the 1960s the hotel fell into financial difficulties and was sold several times, usually with difficulty and under the threat of foreclosure. Its occupancy rates continued to dwindle and, by 1975, only about one-third of its 2,000 rooms were occupied, some sections or whole floors were unused and in poor repair, and the hotel employed only 40 full-time staff.

Facing financial ruin, the owners of the hotel had contracted in 1992 with New York City to house the elderly, Russian emigres, Red Cross disaster victims and the homeless that had H.I.V. or AIDs; leaving only 371 of the original 2,632 rooms occupied.  This lasted up until the devastating 1995 fire.

1995 fire
Because of the hotels’ landmark status, the exterior of the buildings could not be changed. The interior however, did not need to follow those same rules. Many of the once independent structures had become connected on some or all of the floors- such as in the case of the Marquee and Clark buildings- which later caused much confusion to firefighters and Fire Command.  
The building complex at the time of the fire consisted of the following attached structures.
 The Grill Building: 10 stories; 

 Tower Building: 30 stories; 
 Crosshall Building: 6 stories; 
 Pineapple Building: 8 stories; 
 Original St. George Hotel Building: 8 to 12 stories tall; 
 Weller Building: 4 stories; 
 Marquee Building: 12 stories, 
 New York City Subway; located underneath the St. George Hotel with direct access from the lobby to the station
 Covered courtyard; 1 story, unknown dimensions

At 3:00 a.m. on August 26, 1995, many occupants called down to the front desk to report a smell of smoke. The phones in the hotel did not have the capability to call outside the hotel itself. The staff at the front desk noted that the alarm system for the building was not indicating a problem so they did not notify the fire department. At 3:31 a.m. the FDNY Brooklyn communications Center received a call reporting smoke in the area of the St. George hotel by Henry Street. A first alarm response consisting of three engines, two trucks and a battalion chief were on scene by 3:36 a.m. (E-224, E-226, E-207, L-110, L-118) Upon entering, they were told there was no problem in the hotel and that the fire alarm panel did not show any activation. The battalion chief David Maxwell (BC-31) then asked the dispatcher to call back the person who called in the report of smoke so that they could get a better location. The dispatchers’ call was answered by an answering machine so no additional information was available. Following Standard Operation Procedures the units on scene sent a crew member to the roof. Once there, he noticed the glow of fire which was located several buildings down the block at the Clark building. At 3:39 a.m. Battalion Commander Maxwell (BC-31) transmitted a 10-75 radio signal to confirm a working fire which prompted dispatchers to assign a Deputy Chief (DC-6) as well as an additional battalion chief (BC-35), an additional engine company, a rescue company, and a squad company.

Both Ladder companies 110 and 118 made entry into the Clark structure. The building was equipped with a standpipe-Siamese connection so the engine companies proceeded up the stairway with rolled packs of 2.5-inch hose. As they ascended the stairs, they noticed numerous large holes in the floors (made to remove furniture and fixtures) which stopped them in their tracks. This was relayed to BC-31 and the crews proceeded to do a quick primary search for any vagrants who might still be in the building. When the engine crews arrived to the eighth floor, they observed heavy fire above them on the ninth floor which was dropping down through the various openings into the eighth. Firefighters connected their lines to standpipe outlets on the eighth floor and prepared to attack the fire. Outside, Fire hydrant and Siamese connections were made and the standpipe supplied. Unbeknownst to the firefighters at the time, the standpipe had been vandalized with parts of the pipe missing so the water never made it up to the firefighters. The interior fire crews then descended to the fourth floor and dropped their lines out of windows to members below for an exterior stretch. The fire had grown rapidly during this time and consumed almost all of the 8th, 9th and 10th floors. In addition to its vertical progression, it had also extended downward via holes, stairways and elevator shafts and horizontally into exposure #4, the Marquee building, through open interconnecting doorways on several floors. A second alarm and a request for an additional 95-foot tower ladder were transmitted at 4:02 a.m. by BC-31. The Field Communications Unit and Maxi-water system responded automatically on a second alarm.

Once the exterior hose stretch was completed, it was charged and firefighters began to attack the fire. At this point the Command Post was in the street in front of the building and BC-31 was still incident commander. Due to increasingly hazardous conditions, the interior fire crews had to terminate their attack and BC-35 gave the order to remove the interior attack crews. The fire was spreading so rapidly that the handlines were abandoned. Meanwhile, Tower Ladder 119 was set up in front of the building in anticipation of an exterior attack of the heavy fire. TL-119 was ordered to not begin operating until all of the interior firefighters working inside the Clark building were outside. Deputy Chief John W. Kelly (DC-6) arrived on scene at 4:03 a.m., requested a third alarm at 4:06 a.m. and then assumed incident command as the fire began to engulf the Marquee building. The Third alarm brought in four engines, two trucks, the Mask Service Unit (MSU) and a Medical Command Unit.

The fire quickly began to produce a huge volume of fire brands, some of which drifted into open windows of apartments and set them alight. DC-6 assigned BC-35 to exposure 4 to stop the fire from spreading through the marquee building to the attached buildings on the eastern side. A primary search was performed in the Marquee building, but due to its poor structural condition crews were instructed to attack that portion of the fire from the next building East- the Weller Building. This essentially made the Marquee building a buffer zone. As additional companies arrived they were assigned to the building with the greatest life hazard, the Tower Building. The standpipes in the Grill and the Tower buildings were charged while companies began the task of searching and evacuating the residents of the building.

As the fire continue to spread an additional Deputy Chief was requested to the scene to take control of the third exposure- the buildings on Pineapple Street. Several Battalion Chiefs were also called as the need for more supervisory personnel became critical. Already en route from the second alarm, Deputy Assistant Chief Steven C. DeRosa who was the Citywide Tour Commander that day was able to see the flames as he drove over the Brooklyn Bridge from Manhattan and requested a fourth alarm at 4:11 a.m. When he arrived on scene at 4:18 a.m. and was briefed by DC-6 and BC-31 he immediately called for a fifth alarm and assumed command. Within a few minutes after his arrival on scene the fire had completely consumed the top floors of the Clark and Marquee buildings, and had flames shooting up more than 100 feet in the air. Collapse was imminent so the Command Post was quickly moved out of the collapse zone and positioned on Clark Street east of the fire building.

Directly across the street from the fire building at 52 Clark Street was exposure 1, another high-rise building in which many elderly and handicapped people lived. The only exit from this building was onto Clark Street directly across the street from the fire building. Evacuation would require the 450 residents to walk within 40 feet of the fire. With the risk of collapse and the intense radiant heat the decision was made to keep those residents in the building and move them to the rear apartments as far back as possible and protect them in place. Confronted with these immediate problems, DAC DeRosa called for a reorganization of the attack so better control of the incident would be possible.

The incident was soon divided into three sectors, or branches: the Clark Street Branch, the Hicks Street Branch, and the Pineapple Street Branch. A second tactical radio channel was designated for the units operating from the Pineapple Street Branch. A staging area was established at Clark and Henry and a staging officer was assigned. The field communications unit which was commanded by Captain John Timulty and was assisted by Battalion Chief Jackson responded and located units on the command board, set up command channels, kept contact with the staging area and coordinated all communications with the dispatcher Jeanne Williams.

DAC DeRosa requested an additional alarm to respond to calls for embers igniting roof areas of surrounding buildings. With the increased need for dependable water flow at the scene, he requested that the city water department augment the supply by opening up the grids in that area thereby increasing the pressure to the main lines. As the incident continued to grow and complicate the incident command system was expanded. This expansion included a Safety Sector headed by two battalion chiefs, an information sector, an arson task force, a communications sector, a staging sector, an operations sector and a support units’ sector which included two rehab units, the mask service unit, repairs and transportation, tactical support and the Maxi-Water unit.

A battalion chief was assigned to conduct a survey of the entire block. It appeared from the street that the Grill, Tower and St. George apartments were separate buildings. However, the survey determined that the interior had been interconnected to create one large structure. This was not immediately obvious because the exterior of the building was of landmark status and meant that they were mandated to remain basically the same as they were before they were consolidated.  When DAC DeRosa received this information he immediately notified DC-1 of the building configuration and directed him to take charge or both exposures 2 and 3.

The fire-ground was now divided into two basic branches: the Clark Street Branch which included exposures 1 and 2 and the fire building and the Pineapple Street Branch which included exposures 2 and 3. DC-6 was assigned on the Clark side and DC-1 on the Pineapple side. DAC DeRosa directed DC-1 to initiate a separate incident and to communicate directly with Brooklyn Communications to request resources. A secondary command post was established at the corner of Hicks and Pineapple and a second alarm assignment was requested by DC-1 to report to the Pineapple Sector which included the Pineapple and Crosshall buildings. The equivalent of a third alarm was requested to assist the companies that were already operating in the tower building. Additional alarms for the Clark Street side were transmitted as follows: #6 at 5:06 a.m., #7 at 5:09 a.m. #8 at 5:28 a.m., #9 at 6:15 a.m., #10 at 7:17 a.m., and #11 at 7:20 a.m. The fire was declared under control at 7:09 a.m. but it took many days for all the fires and spot fires in the surrounding area to be extinguished.

After an extensive arson and police investigation, it was determined that a 61-year-old had accidentally started the fire while he was ransacking a vacant section of the Clark Building looking for copper pipe to steal and then sell. “The police said Mr. Foressie broke into the dark, vacant building at 51 Clark Street during the early morning hours hoping to steal some copper tubing. But as he reached the 10th floor, the fire from his makeshift torch touched some combustible material, setting off a blaze that eventually destroyed that building and spread to three others in the complex.”

Present day
Today, the St. George Tower is a co-op owned and run by the St. George Tower and Grill Owners Corp. and is located at 111 Hicks Street (also known as 44 Pineapple Street).

The 100 Henry Street entrance, also known as the "Weller Wing" of the St. George and previously the hotel main entrance, is now part of Educational Housing Services (EHS), which provides dormitory service to NYC area university students. This same entrance also allows access to the EHS-owned "Studio Wing". In 2005, EHS expanded their St. George operations and opened a new wing of the building at 55 Clark Street known as Clark Residence constructed over the site of the hotel building destroyed by fire in 1995. EHS houses 1,200 domestic and international students. Street level house shops, restaurants, and charming neighborhood shops occupy the street fronts on Clark and Henry. The subway entrance is located on the Henry Street entrance.

In media
Columbia Records (now Sony Classical) used the Grand Ballroom at the Hotel St. George as a venue for several famous recordings by Leonard Bernstein and the New York Philharmonic. Among them are Tchaikovsky's Romeo and Juliet Fantasy Overture (recorded on January 28, 1957), Stravinsky's The Rite of Spring (January 1958), and Gershwin's An American in Paris (December 1958) and Rhapsody in Blue (June 1959).

In the 1972 film The Godfather, the meeting between Luca Brasi and Virgil Sollozzo was filmed in the hotel's lobby bar.
The fish motif glass panel was designed by David Harriton, and created and installed  by Harriton Carved Glass, 522 E. 72nd St. New York 21 New York.

References

External links

 

1885 establishments in New York (state)
Brooklyn Heights
Building and structure fires in New York City
Emery Roth buildings
Hotels established in 1885
Hotels in Brooklyn
New York City Subway infrastructure
Residential buildings in Brooklyn